Imprisoned Soul is a German silent drama film of 1917 directed by Rudolf Biebrach and starring Henny Porten, Paul Bildt, and Curt Goetz. A young woman, Violetta, falls under the hypnotic power of the villainous Baron von Groot. A young physician tries to rescue her from his clutches. She is finally released from Groot's power when he is found shot dead. The film's theme of hypnotic domination is very similar to that of The Cabinet of Dr. Caligari (1919) which the screenwriter Weine was to direct two years later.

Cast
 Henny Porten – Violetta
 Paul Bildt – Baron von Groot
 Curt Goetz – Stefan Rainer

References

Bibliography
 Jung, Uli & Schatzberg, Walter. Beyond Caligari: The Films of Robert Wiene. Berghahn Books, 1999.

External links
 

1917 films
German silent feature films
German drama films
Films of the German Empire
Films directed by Rudolf Biebrach
1917 drama films
Films about hypnosis
German black-and-white films
Silent drama films
1910s German films